Callicorixa praeusta is a species of Corixidae or water boatman, in the order Hemiptera.

References

Insects described in 1848
Corixini